Rob Griffin may refer to:

Rob Griffin, character in Janus (TV series) 
Rob Griffin, member of the band Howards Alias

See also
Robert Griffin (disambiguation)
Bob Griffin (disambiguation)